The Future of Us is a 2011 contemporary fiction novel written by Jay Asher and Carolyn Mackler. The novel was published on November 21, 2011 by Razorbill, a division of Penguins Young Readers Group.

Plot

Josh and Emma are about to discover themselves—fifteen years in the future.

It's 1996, and Josh and Emma have been neighbors their whole lives. They've been best friends almost as long—at least, up until last November, when everything changed. Things have been awkward ever since then, but when Josh's family gets a free AOL CD-ROM in the mail, his mom makes him take it to Emma so she can install it on her new computer. When they sign on, they're automatically logged onto Facebook, which hasn't been invented yet. Josh and Emma are looking at themselves fifteen years in the future. Their spouses, careers, homes, and status updates—it's all there. And every time they refresh their pages, their futures change. As they grapple with the ups and downs of their future, they're forced to confront what they're doing right—and wrong—in the present.
They end up discovering that they have feelings for each other and eventually start a life together.

Reception
The novel has received mixed to positive reviews.
The film option rights for the movie version of the book has been sold to Warner Bros.

Characters 
Josh Templeton is a friendly, somewhat awkward redheaded kid. Emma Nelson is a friendly, more social character.

References

2011 American novels
Fiction set in 1996
Collaborative novels
Novels about social media
Novels about time travel
Novels set in the 1990s
Razorbill books